All-Star break may refer to:
MLB All-Star break, break for Major League Baseball All-Star Game
NBA All-Star break, break for National Basketball Association All-Star Game